Aya Sawan Jhoom Ke is a 1969 film directed by Raghunath Jhalani. It became a box office hit. The film stars Dharmendra, Asha Parekh, Nazir Hussain, Nirupa Roy, Bindu, Aruna Irani, and Rajindernath. The music is by Laxmikant Pyarelal and the lyrics by Anand Bakshi. The songs were meaningful and also melodious. # 8 at Box-Office Collection list.

Plot summary 

Housemaid Maya(Nirupa Roy) accidentally kills her master while trying to resist his attempts to molest her. Hunted by the police, Maya decides to leave her son on the doors of a temple. The child is discovered by the temple priest who decides to take the child home and bring him up. Just then, a rich man (Nasir Hussain) and his wife come to the temple and pray to God for granting them a child. Hearing them, the temple priest hands over the abandoned child to them and asks them to bring him up as their own child. The couple name the child as Jaishankar. When Jaishankar grows up, he starts looking after the business of his father.

One day, Jaishankar meets and falls in love with Aarti (Astha Parekh). After successfully wooing her, he agrees to meet with her dad to discuss their marriage. On the way to her house, he ironically runs over her father, killing him instantly. Guilt-ridden, he attempts to make amends to look after Aarti, her brother, Pappu, and sister, Mala, but conceals the fact that he was responsible for their father's death. Things get worse after Aarti not only discovers the truth but also witnesses him getting intimate with a cabaret dancer, Rita. Then Jaishankar is first disowned by his father after the family finds out that he had sired a son from Rita, and then subsequently arrested by the Police for killing Rita. However, it turns out that he is saving his sister's husband Rajesh and was being blackmailed by Rita for money. In the end, it is revealed that Rita's real husband shot her for cheating other people and her greed for money.

Cast 
 Asha Parekh as Aarti
 Dharmendra as Jaishankar 'Jai'
 Ravindra Kapoor as Rajesh
 Nazir Hussain as Lala Jugal Kishore
 Rajendra Nath as Sadhuram Sood
 Nirupa Roy as Maya
 Sunder as Dr. Yudhvir Singh
 Shivraj as Aarti's Father
 Laxmi Chhaya as Rita
 Bindu as Seeta
 Aruna Irani as Mala
 Jalal Agha as Deepak
 Dulari as Mrs. Jugal Kishore
 Madhu Apte
 Keshav Rana as Lori
 Narbada Shankar as sadhu in the temple
 Rajan Kapoor
 Brahm Bhardwaj as Deepak's dad
 Master Shahid as Pappu
 Neena
 Mac Mohan as Madman
 Uma Dutt as Maya's Employer
 Kartar Singh Sikh man set in theatre
 Rirkoo
 Ramesh Bhatia
 Nazir Kashmiri as Madho
 Kumari Naaz as Sangeeta Y. Singh

Soundtrack

References

External links 
 

1960s Hindi-language films
1969 films
Films scored by Laxmikant–Pyarelal